The Suspect is a 2013 South Korean action spy film starring Gong Yoo, and directed by Won Shin-yun.

Plot
Ji Dong-cheol was once one of the top special forces agent in North Korea, but after a change in political system, he was abandoned by his government while on a mission. He goes on the run, seeking his wife and daughter who were sold as slaves to China, only to discover their corpses. When he learns that an ex-colleague was behind their deaths, Dong-cheol goes on a vendetta for revenge, defecting to the South to chase his family's killer. Now living incognito, he searches for his nemesis during the day, and at night works as a personal chauffeur for Chairman Park, a business executive with ties to Pyongyang. One night the chairman is attacked and killed by an assassin, but not before handing over a special pair of glasses to Dong-cheol. The South Korean intelligence service, a member of which frames Dong-cheol for the murder, goes on the hunt for the beleaguered former spy. The manhunt is led by Min Se-hoon, a colonel and drill sergeant with whom Dong-cheol shares a past, and Kim Seok-ho, the director of the NIS. Aided by a feisty documentary filmmaker, Dong-cheol goes on the run again while trying to recover top-secret materials that his dying boss sent him to find.

Cast
 Gong Yoo as Ji Dong-cheol, a former highly ranked North Korean spy turned defector investigating the murder of his family and accused of the murder of a business executive
 Park Hee-soon as Min Se-hoon, a South Korean NIS operative demoted to drill sergeant after a failed mission where Ji Dong-cheol spared him
 Jo Sung-ha as Kim Seok-ho, NIS director, the main antagonist
 Yoo Da-in as Choi Kyung-hee, filmmaker of a documentary on North Korean defectors who follows Dong-cheol around and sympathizes with his past
 Kim Sung-kyun as Ri Kwang-jo, a North Korean defector who Ji Dong-cheol believes killed his family 
 Jo Jae-yoon as Captain Jo, who assists Min Se-hoon and investigates Ji Dong-cheol's innocence 
 Park Ji-il as Executive director Song
 Kim Min-jae as Reporter Joo
 Kim Eui-sung as Deputy department head Shin
 Won Poong-yeon as Kim Seok-ho's underling
 Won Jin as SA1
 Song Jae-rim as Professor Kim (SA2)
 Choi Jong-ryul as Butler Moon
 Nam Bo-ra as Ji Dong-cheol's wife
 Lee Na-eun as Ri Kwang-jo's wife
 Song Jae-ho as Haejoo Group president Park Geon-ho
 Gi Ju-bong as coroner
 Jo Seok-hyun as Colonel Choi
 Lee Yong-jik as bearded stranger
 Choi Tae-hwan as mysterious casualty
 Lee Dong-jin as North wanderer

Production
Yoon Kye-sang was originally cast in the lead role, but dropped out after co-star Choi Min-sik left the project.

Gong Yoo was eventually cast, and the protagonist's name "Ji Dong-cheol" is similar to the actor's birth name, Gong Ji-cheol. To create the right physique for his role, Gong went on a diet for three months to reduce his body fat. He learned the Russian martial art Systema for the film's fight scenes, and performed car chases, rock climbing and skydiving at the Han River without using stuntmen.

The film was partly shot in Puerto Rico in April 2013.

Release
The Suspect opened in South Korea on December 24, 2013. It was a box office hit, with 4.1 million admissions.

The film's distribution rights was sold to seven territories, including North America, Japan, Hong Kong, Taiwan, India, the Middle East and German-speaking countries. Will Go USA screened the film in 15 theaters in the United States on January 10, 2014.

Reception
On review aggregator Rotten Tomatoes, the film holds an approval rating of 75% based on eight reviews, with an average rating of 6.67/10. On Metacritic, the film has a weighted average score of 63 out of 100, based on five critics, indicating "generally favorable reviews".

The Los Angeles Times praised the film's "inspired and teeth-grittingly determined" set pieces. The Washington Post wrote that the film "should entertain any action buff," while Screen Daily, a film journal in the UK, also gave a good review: "the style of the action scenes is so explosive and immersive that the movie even threatens the reputation of the 007 series." The New York Times reviewed that the "guns-or-butter dichotomy" is "more resonant than you'd expect."

Awards and nominations

References

External links
  
 
 
 

South Korean action thriller films
South Korean spy thriller films
2013 films
2010s Korean-language films
Films directed by Won Shin-yun
South Korean chase films
2013 action thriller films
2010s spy thriller films
2010s South Korean films